Euphorbia davidii, known as David's spurge or toothed spurge, is a species of flowering plant in the spurge family Euphorbiaceae.

Distribution and habitat
Euphorbia davidii is native to parts of southwest and central North America. It is apparently not native to eastern and northern North America, South America, Australia, Russia, and other areas where it occurs worldwide. Euphorbia davidii is found in a variety of habitats, from forests, riparian areas, and prairies, to gravel roadsides and railroads.

As a pest
In March 2021 the EPPO (European and Mediterranean Plant Protection Organization) added E. davidii to its Alert List due to concerns it may move beyond its current habitats - railway lines - and into agricultural lands; and because it recently appeared in Central Russia.

References

davidii
Flora of North America